The Tenerife Experiment was a Cosmic Microwave Background (CMB) experiment built by Jodrell Bank (then known as the Nuffield Radio Astronomy Laboratories) of the University of Manchester in collaboration with the Instituto de Astrofisica de Canarias (IAC). It was the first CMB experiment to be installed and run at the Observatorio del Teide in Tenerife, starting operations in October 1984, and running with various upgrades and additional experiments until 2000.

It measured anisotropy of the CMB on angular sizes of 5 degrees, about the size of the upper half of the constellation of Orion (from the "belt" to the "shoulders"). To reduce receiver instability, it performed fast Dicke Switching between two horns separated by 8 degrees. To remove long term drifts and atmospheric variations, it used a further switch of 8 degrees using a flat mirror in front of the horns.

References 

Jodrell Bank Observatory
Radio telescopes
Cosmic microwave background experiments